Mutara Game Reserve (also known as Mutara Hunting Reserve or Mutara Hunting Fields) is a former protected area in Rwanda.

See also 

 Akagera National Park, an adjacent park that was similarly reduced in size, though not entirely de-listed

References

Protected areas of Rwanda